Nacka FC is a Swedish football club located in the Stockholm suburb of Nacka. The club is a merger club consisting of Nacka FC, a youth club formed in 2015 and FC Iliria Stockholm, a team formed by the ethnic Albanian community in Stockholm the same year. The clubs merged in 2019, under the name FC Nacka Iliria and later fully merged to the common name Nacka FC.

Background
Since their foundation in 2015, Nacka FC has achieved a record-paced climb up the  Swedish football league system. Together with FC Stockholm Internazionale they are the only club in the Swedish capital who has managed to climb from the lowest division (division 7) all the way up to division 2 within 7 seasons. The club is also the youngest club participating in the top tiers of Swedish football (Allsvenskan to division 3).

As newcomers to division 2 Södra Svealand in season 2023, the club will continue to be managed by the Swedish-Bosnian coach Eldin Kozica. The Sport Director is Salih Shala, the Swedish-Albanian co-founder of the club who has been in charge of the first team since its debut in the lowest division in Sweden.

Players

First-team squad

Season to Season

External links 
 FC Iliria – Official website

Footnotes

Football clubs in Stockholm